Forelius grandis is a species of ant in the genus Forelius. Described by Forel in 1912, the species is endemic to Argentina.

References

Dolichoderinae
Hymenoptera of South America
Insects described in 1912